Gösta Johan Harwey Bredefeldt (19 December 1935 – 9 January 2010) was a Swedish actor. He appeared in more than 60 films and television shows between 1961 and 2009. He starred in the 1974 film A Handful of Love, which was entered into the 24th Berlin International Film Festival.

Filmography

References

External links

1935 births
2010 deaths
Swedish male film actors
People from Gothenburg
20th-century Swedish male actors